Pat Murphy may refer to:

 Pat Murphy (writer) (born 1955), American science and science-fiction writer
 Pat Murphy (catcher) (1857–1927), American baseball player
 Pat Murphy (Australian footballer, born 1906) (1906–1973), Australian rules footballer with Hawthorn
 Pat Murphy (Australian footballer, born 1947), Australian rules footballer with St Kilda
 Pat Murphy (Welsh footballer) (born 1947)
 Pat Murphy (baseball coach) (born 1958), American baseball coach
 Pat Murphy (Iowa politician) (born 1959), American politician 
 Pat Murphy (Canadian politician), member of the Legislative Assembly of Prince Edward Island, from 2007 to 2019
 Pat Murphy (sports journalist), British sports writer and broadcaster
 Pat Murphy (director) (born 1951), Irish film director
 Pat Murphy (rugby union) (c. 1878–c. 1945), Australian rugby union player
 Pat Murphy (rugby league) (1896-?), Australian rugby player

See also
 Patrick Murphy (disambiguation)
 Patricia Murphy (disambiguation)